Santa Maria degli Angeli ("St. Mary of the Angels") is the name of several churches in Italy and one in Libya. They include:

Santa Maria degli Angeli e dei Martiri, a basilica in Rome, created by Michelangelo in the Baths of Diocletian
Basilica of Santa Maria degli Angeli in Assisi
Santa Maria degli Angeli, Florence
Santa Maria degli Angeli, Milan, best known as Sant'Angelo
Santa Maria degli Angeli (Venice), in the island of Murano, Venice
Santa Maria degli Angeli in Perugia
Santa Maria degli Angeli (Tripoli) in Tripoli

Places
Santa Maria degli Angeli (Assisi), a civil parish (frazione) of Assisi

de:Sankt Maria von den Engeln